The News-Herald is a bi-weekly newspaper serving the Downriver suburbs of Detroit. It is based in Southgate, Michigan, and owned by Digital First Media as part of its Detroit region.

The newspaper is published every Wednesday and Sunday.

History
The News-Heralds history dates back to the 1870s, when the Rev. George W. Owen established the Wyandotte Herald in Wyandotte, MI. After merging with the Wyandotte Daily News, from 1944 it was known as the Wyandotte News-Herald. The Mellus Newspapers started in the 1920s, subsequently flourished for decades under famous publisher/editor William Mellus.

The current News-Herald format was established under the Heritage Newspapers brand in 1986, when the late industrialist Heinz Prechter brought the old News-Herald (based in Wyandotte, MI) and Mellus Newspapers (based in Lincoln Park, MI) from SEM Newspapers Inc. and combined them into a single Downriver publication each Wednesday. In 1988, The News-Herald relocated to their current offices at Interstate 75 and Northline Road in Southgate, MI and launched "Weekender" editions in select communities, which was later incorporated into Heritage Sunday and is now known as the Sunday News-Herald. A Friday edition of The News-Herald delivered exclusively via the United States Postal Service began publishing on March 3, 2006 and was discontinued after the April 20, 2012 edition.

Following the 2013 merger of 21st Century Media and MediaNews Group to form Digital First Media, the current owner, the News-Herald was placed in 2014 into Digital First's newly formed Detroit region, which also includes longtime sister papers The Macomb Daily and The Detroit News.  The other 21st Century-owned newspapers in Michigan were placed into Digital First's Michigan region, headquartered in Pontiac.

In 2016 severe cuts to the newsroom left them with one sports reporter who split time also covering sports for a sister newspaper in Dearborn, and three full time reporters to cover the communities Downriver.

External links
 The News-Herald
 Searchable archive at Bacon Memorial District Library of Wyandotte Herald (1895-1943) and News-Herald (1944-Present)

References

Newspapers published in Michigan
21st Century Media publications
Publishing companies established in 1879
1879 establishments in Michigan
1986 establishments in Michigan
Digital First Media
Southgate, Michigan